Chester Hardy Aldrich (November 10, 1863March 10, 1924) was an American politician. A member of the Republican Party, he served as the 16th governor of Nebraska and as a justice of the Nebraska Supreme Court.

Personal life
Aldrich was born in Pierpont in Ashtabula County, Ohio.  He married Sylvia Estelle Stroman on June 4, 1889, and they had five children. He was a member of the Methodist Episcopal Church, a Freemason and a Knight Templar. He died in office on March 10, 1924.

Education
After he graduated from the prep school at Hillsdale College in Michigan, Aldrich entered the Ohio State University as a freshman in 1884.  While at Ohio State he became a champion orator, served as an editor of The Lantern, and in 1886 became the captain of an abortive first attempt at forming an Ohio State University football team. He graduated from Ohio State in 1888 with an A.B.

In a commencement address, delivered at his university soon after his election as governor of Nebraska, he offered his views on the topic of "Progressive Citizenship."

Political life
Aldrich settled in Ulysses, Nebraska, where he worked as a high school principal and livestock rancher while he studied law. He passed the Nebraska Bar in 1890 and began practicing law in David City.  He served as mayor of David City, and was elected to the Nebraska State Senate in 1906. As a state senator he wrote the Railway Commission Law and the Aldrich Freight Rate Law, which attacked the power of the Nebraska railroad trusts. When the laws were brought to Federal Court, Aldrich personally served as counsel for the state and the laws were sustained.

In 1910, with support from Populist Democrat William Jennings Bryan, and over opposition of the trusts, Aldrich was elected governor of Nebraska.  During his tenure as governor, a co-operative association act was sanctioned; a board of control for state institutions was established; a sanitary health bill was authorized; and a road program was initiated. He held the position until 1913.

Aldrich was elected as a justice of the Nebraska Supreme Court in 1918, and remained in that position until his death.

References

External links

 National Governors Association
  
 

People from Ashtabula County, Ohio
Republican Party governors of Nebraska
Republican Party Nebraska state senators
Justices of the Nebraska Supreme Court
Nebraska state court judges
Hillsdale College alumni
Methodists from Nebraska
1863 births
1924 deaths
People from David City, Nebraska
Mayors of places in Nebraska
American Freemasons
People from Butler County, Nebraska
Ohio State Buckeyes football players